Military College Jhelum (MCJ) is a feeder college to Military Intermediate College, in Sarai Alamgir, Pakistan. Though it is physically located in Gujrat District, due to its very close proximity, it is still associated with the City of Jhelum, and is considered to be in the cantonment limit of Jhelum. The institution feeds the Pakistan Military Academy, Kakul. Military College Jhelum is one of three military colleges in Pakistan; the others being Military College Murree and Military College Sui.

History

The college's foundation stone was laid on 25th February 1922 by the Prince of Wales at Jalandhar Cantonment for the King George Royal Indian Military Schools (KGRIMS) at the Jallandhar and Jhelum in Punjab. Regular classes at the college began on 15 September 1925. Jallandhar is now in the Indian state of Punjab but the school was relocated to the state of Himachal Pradesh after being renamed as the Chail Military School.

Location
Military College Jhelum is located in the district of Gujrat in the town of Sarai Alamgir. Due to its proximity to city of Jhelum and because original Jhelum was on Sarai Alamgir side plus the inclusion of Sarai Alamgir in district Jhelum before 1998, it is widely known as Military College Jhelum (MCJ).

List of Commandants
Commandants and their tenure start dates are:

Notable alumni

The college has produced five four-star generals of Pakistan Army, Air Force and Navy, namely former Chairman Joint Chiefs of Staff General Muhammad Iqbal Khan (Late), former Chief of Air Staff Air Chief Marshal Zulfiqar Ali Khan (late), former Chief of Naval Staff Admiral Abdul Aziz Mirza, former Vice Chief of Army Staff General Yusaf Khan, and former Chief of Army Staff General Ashfaq Parvez Kayani.

College has 40 Swords of Honour, and many gallantry medals including one Nishan-e-Haider Major Muhammad Akram.

The senior notable military officers of the College Alumni include;
 Lt Gen (R) Muhammad Safdar, SBt, Governor of Punjab and Chief of General Staff, GHQ
 Lt General (R) Nazar Hussain, HI (M), Commander Army Air Defence Command
 Maj Gen (R) Muhammad Akram,
 Maj Gen (R) Ghazanfar Ali Khan, GOC 41st Infantry Division, Quetta and Vice Chief of General Staff, GHQ
 Lt Gen (R) Raza Muhammad Khan, Commander XXXI Corps, Bahawalpur
 Maj Gen Tariq Mehmood, Deputy DG ISI, Islamabad
 Maj Gen Zahir Shah, Director General Survey of Pakistan
 Lt Gen Javed Iqbal, AG GHQ
 Masood Ashraf Raja, English Professor, University of North Texas
 Maj Gen Obaidullah Khan
 Gen Ashfaq Parvez Kayani, Ex-Chief Of Army Staff Pakistan
 Maj Gen Kamal Anwar Chaudry, IG FC South Balochistan
9184 DC Rayan

See also
 Army Burn Hall College
 List of cadet colleges in Pakistan
 Military College Sui

References

External links
 

Schools in Punjab, Pakistan
Cadet colleges in Pakistan
Military schools in India
Jhelum
Education in Jhelum
Intermediate colleges in Pakistan
1922 establishments in India
Pakistan Military Academy